King Zhao may refer to:

King Zhao of Zhou (1027–957 BC), king of the Zhou dynasty
King Zhao of Chu (died 489 BC), king of Chu during the Spring and Autumn period
King Zhaoxiang of Qin (325–251 BC), also known as King Zhao of Qin

See also
Duke Zhao (disambiguation)
Prince of Zhao (disambiguation)